Slava's Snowshow is a stage show created and staged by Russian performance artist Slava Polunin. The show won the Drama Desk Award for Unique Theatrical Experience and was nominated for the Tony Award for Best Special Theatrical Event.

Productions
Slava's Snowshow made its world premiere in October 1993 in Moscow.

Slava's Snowshow opened Off-Broadway on September 8, 2004 at the Union Square Theatre, created and staged by Slava Polunin, with costumes and scenic design by Anna Hannikainen. The show closed on January 7, 2007.

The show opened on Broadway at the Helen Hayes Theatre on December 7, 2008 and closed on January 4, 2009 after 7 previews and 35 performances. The show was created and staged by Slava Polunin, with sound by Rastyam Dubinnikov, lighting by Alexander Pecherskiy and art direction by Gary Cherniakhovskii.

The show opened at the Old Vic in London in 1997. The show ran at the Royal Festival Hall, London from December 17, 2012 to January 7, 2013. The show returned to the Royal Festival Hall from December 18, 2017 to January 4, 2018. The show ran at the Bluma Appel Theatre at St. Lawrence Centre, Toronto in December 2018. The reviewer wrote: " 'Slava’s Snowshow' is a puzzling theatrical art form, but strangely alluring to watch as I couldn’t take my eyes off the performers. Their movements are precisely choreographed and timed either to the music or the sounds echoing throughout the auditorium."

The show will run on Broadway at the Stephen Sondheim Theatre in a limited engagement starting on November 11, 2019 in previews through January 5, 2020.

Overview
The show features a group of clowns wearing green with one clown wearing yellow, in a "celebration of winter and snow."

Awards and nominations
The show won the 2005 Drama Desk Award for Unique Theatrical Experience.

Anna Hannikainen was nominated for the 2005 Lucille Lortel Award for Outstanding Costume and Scenic Design.

Slava's Snowshow won the 1998 Olivier Award for Best Entertainment.

Gallery

Music
 La Petite Fille de la mer - Vangelis
Chariots of Fire - Vangelis
Stalakdrama - Yello
Peter Gunn Theme - Henry Mancini
Bolero - Maurice Ravel
 Le soldat Tufalev se marie (Soldier Tufalev Gets Married) - Jean-Mark Zelwer
 Blue Canary - Vincent Fiorino
Mas que Nada - Luiz Henrique Rosa
Toccata and Fugue in D minor -  Johann Sebastian Bach
 Kaleb - Ivan Volkov
 Krasivaya - Roman Dubinnikov
 Illusion (feat. Jorge Struntz) - Stéphane Grappelli
 Edges of Illusion - John Surman
Concierto de Aranjuez - Joaquín Rodrigo
Carmina Burana - O Fortuna - Carl Orff
Moonlight Sonata - Ludwig van Beethoven

References

External links

 Official website
 
 

Pantomime
Drama Desk Award winners
Laurence Olivier Award winners